Rosenbergia darwini is a species of beetle in the family Cerambycidae. It was described by Casadio in 2008.

References

Batocerini
Beetles described in 2008